Kalareh-ye Mehrabi (also Romanized as Kalāreh-ye Mehrābī; also known as Band Kalāleh, Kalāreh, Kalāreh-ye ‘Amaleh, and Kehlāra Zuhāb) is a village in Dasht-e Zahab Rural District, in the Central District of Sarpol-e Zahab County, Kermanshah Province, Iran. At the 2006 census, its population was 33, in 7 families.

References 

Populated places in Sarpol-e Zahab County